Adalberto Pereira da Silva Nascimento (born 12 May 1979) is a Brazilian male handball player. He was a member of the Brazil men's national handball team, playing as a right wing. He played at the 2004 Summer Olympics. He was a member of São Bernardo do Campo from 2003 to 2006.

References

1979 births
Living people
Brazilian male handball players
Handball players at the 2004 Summer Olympics
Olympic handball players of Brazil
Sportspeople from Minas Gerais
21st-century Brazilian people